Şamlar is a village in Başakşehir district of İstanbul Province, Turkey. The population of Şamlar is 3448  as of 2010. 
The oldest building in the village is a mosque dated 1839. A part of village territory was confiscated during the construction of Sazlıdere Dam. For that part, the government started a new housing project which is now called Yenişamlar ("new Şamlar"). The main economic activities of the village are agriculture, cattle breeding, fishing and some light industries.

References

Villages in Istanbul Province
Başakşehir